John Steve Nessel (born 1952) is a former professional American football player. Nessel was an All-American guard at Penn State in 1974 and was the 4th-round draft pick (#81 overall) of the Atlanta Falcons in the 1975 NFL draft.

Nessel earned a Bachelor of Science in Industrial Arts Education from Penn State in 1975, and is now a technology education instructor at Ridgefield High School in Ridgefield, Connecticut. He lives with his wife Jo Ann, in Wilton, Connecticut.

References

External links
"24 Great Unsung Lions: A Historical Look"

Living people
1952 births
American football offensive guards
Atlanta Falcons players
Penn State Nittany Lions football players
People from Wilton, Connecticut